Mohammed V University, in Rabat, Morocco, was founded in 1957 under a royal decree (Dahir). It is the first modern university in Morocco after the University of al-Qarawiyyin in Fez.

History 
The university was founded in 1957. It is named for Mohammed V, the former King of Morocco who died in 1961.

In 1993, it was divided into two independent universities: Mohammed V University at Agdal and Mohammed V University at Souissi.
 
In September 2014 the two universities merged into one, known as Mohammed V University, but maintaining the two campuses. The university has 18 total colleges as of 2020.

On 23 February 2023, Mohammed V University and Islamic World Educational, Scientific and Cultural Organization signed an agreement establishing the “ICESCO Open Education Chair” at the university for “equitable access to inclusive and quality education”.

Alumni
Mohammed Abed Al Jabri, Moroccan academic and philosopher; he graduated from the university with a bachelor's degree in philosophy in 1967 and a PhD in 1970.
Rafik Abdessalem, Minister of Foreign Affairs under Prime Minister Hamadi Jebali, received a B.A. in philosophy from Mohammed V University.
Soumia Fahd, Moroccan herpetologist
Laila Lalami, Moroccan novelist now working in the United States, 2015 finalist for the Pulitzer Prize for The Moor's Account, a fictional novel of the historic figure Estevanico, the first black explorer of North America and one of four survivors of the 1527 Narvaez expedition.
Nabila Mounib, the secretary general of the Unified Socialist Party.
Ahmed Toufiq, Moroccan writer and historian who has served as Minister for Islamic Affairs in the government of Morocco since 2002.
Moulay Rachid of Morocco Prince of Morocco.
Mohammed VI of Morocco, King of Morocco.
Zohour Alaoui, Moroccan ambassador to Sweden and Permanent Representative of Morocco to UNESCO

Rankings and reputation

See also 
 List of universities
 List of universities in Morocco

References

External links
 Mohammed V University 
 Times Ed university rankings

 
1957 establishments in Morocco
Universities in Morocco
Educational institutions established in 1957
U
Buildings and structures in Rabat
20th-century architecture in Morocco